Grubovia is a genus of flowering plants belonging to the family Amaranthaceae.

It is native to Hungary, Romania, Yugoslavia, Kazakhstan, Kyrgyzstan, Tajikistan, Turkmenistan, West Siberia, Mongolia, Tibet and parts of China (Manchuria, Inner Mongolia, Qinghai and Xinjiang). 

It has been introduced into Czechoslovakia. 

The genus name of Grubovia is in honour of Valeri Grúbov (1917–2009), a Russian botanist with a focus on central Asia.
It was first described and published in Taxon Vol.60 on page 72 in 2011. 

Known species, according to Kew:
Grubovia brevidentata 
Grubovia dasyphylla 
Grubovia krylowii 
Grubovia melanoptera 
Grubovia mucronata 
Grubovia sedoides

References

Amaranthaceae
Amaranthaceae genera
Plants described in 2011